Muñeca Brava (Wild Angel; lit. "Rough Doll") is an Argentine telenovela, produced by Telefe in 1998–1999. The television series was broadcast in more than 80 countries over the world, enjoying high ratings.

The show was written by Enrique Oscar Torres and directed by Hernán Abrahamsohn, Gaita Aragona and Víctor Stella. The first episode was aired in Argentina on 10 October 1998 on channel Telefe. The play was filmed mainly in Argentina (Buenos Aires). Though some of the episodes were filmed in Italy and Spain. The programme is known for launching the international career of Natalia Oreiro.

Plot 
The story revolves around Milagros and Ivo, two people who fall in love with each other in spite of the odds against them. It is a romantic comedy novela that also touches on issues of family, wealth, greed, deception, and most of all—love. Milagros was brought up in an orphanage when her mother died giving birth to her. She had no idea who her father was and spent all her years despising him for abandoning them.

She ends up becoming a house servant at the Di Carlo mansion when she turns 18, since she can no longer stay in the orphanage. In the mansion, she meets new friends, and people who treat her as family. But she also gains new foes who hate her for her tactless and feisty character. Most of all, she meets the love of her life, Ivo Di Carlo, the heir of the Di Carlo fortune. Theirs is a love-hate relationship, decorated with comedic antics they play on each other, and passion of their true love.

Ivo Di Carlo is a playboy, immature, and boastful. He has had everything handed to him on a silver platter. But he lacks the love of a father, as Federico Di Carlo makes him feel unwanted. Milagros, on the other hand, is religious, playful, and has a strong character. Their relationship survives many challenges, including issues that root from their parents' deceptive acts, secret love affairs, greediness, and ambition. As a playboy, Ivo also has several girls that go between him and Milagros, the most significant are Andrea, Florencia, and Pilar. Milagros also has flings of her own, she forges relationships with Pablo and Sergio.

At some points, the two even think they are siblings, as Federico Di Carlo is revealed to be Milagros' real father. However, it is also later revealed that Ivo is the son of Luisa Di Carlo's lover, Nestor Miranda. In the end, Ivo and Milagros survive the tests of their relationship and wed in front of the people they love.

Cast

Music

Natalia Oreiro 

 Cambio dolor or Cambio Dolor (Pumpin' Dolls Pool Party Club Mix)
 Me muero de amor
 Vengo del mar
 De tu Amor or De Tu Amor (Pumpin' Dolls Fashion Club Mix)
 Uruguay 
 Se pego en mi piel 
 Sabrosito y dulzon
 Y te vas conmigo
 Fuiste original singing by Gilda, performance in Muñeca brava performed Oreiro
 Nada mas que hablar
 Que si que si or Que Si, Que Si (Little Corp Mix)

Rafaga 
Rafaga performed by mostly at the disco party

 La Luna y Tu   
 Maldito corazon  
 Mentirosa

Other musicians 

 Mama by Spice Girls
 Quien Será by Daniel Agostini
 Y quisiera by Ella baila sola
 A fuego lento by Rosana 
 Penelope by Diego Torres
 Cuanto Amor Me Das by Eros Ramazzotti 
 Nunca Te Decides (Que Si, Que No) by El Simbolo
 Te Perdi by Chris Duran 
 Desesperadamente Enamorado by Jordi 
 Nunca Te Olvidaré by Enrique Iglesias
 Cómo Te Voy a Olvidar by Los Ángeles Azules
 Corazón partío by Alejandro Sanz
 Se Me Antoja by Francisco Céspedes 
 Bésame Mucho by Luis Miguel
 Pienso en tí by Chayanne 
 Olvidarte by Ricardo Arjona
 Decir adiós by Carlos Ponce 
 Dónde van by Diego Torres 
 Como un Ángel by Fabrizio Casalino
 Mira Para Arriba by Lalo Fransen
 Hey Now Now by Swirl 360

Remakes 
Portugal – Anjo Selvagem (2001–2003)
India – Miilee (2005–2006)
Mexico – Al diablo con los guapos (2007–2008)
Indonesia – Hafizah (2009–2010) 
Peru – La Tayson, corazón rebelde (2012)

References

External links

1998 telenovelas
1998 Argentine television series debuts
1999 Argentine television series endings
Argentine telenovelas
Telefe telenovelas
Spanish-language telenovelas